Department of Industrial Relations may refer to:

 Department of Industrial Relations (1978–82), an Australian government department
 Department of Industrial Relations (1987–97), an Australian government department
 California Department of Industrial Relations